Kori N. Schake (born 1962) is the Director of Foreign and Defense Policy at the American Enterprise Institute. She has held several high positions in the U.S. Defense and State Departments and on the National Security Council. She was a foreign-policy adviser to the McCain-Palin 2008 presidential campaign. Schake is a contributing writer at The Atlantic.

Professional career

Schake obtained her PhD in government from the University of Maryland, where she was a student of George Quester, Thomas Schelling, and Catherine Kelleher. She holds MA degrees in both government and from the School of Public Affairs. She did her undergraduate studies at Stanford University, including studying under Condoleezza Rice.

Pentagon

Schake's first government job was with U.S. Department of Defense as a NATO Desk Officer in the Joint Staff's Strategic Plans and Policy Division (J-5), where from 1990 to 1994 she worked military issues of German unification, NATO after the Cold War, and alliance expansion. She also spent 2 years (1994–1996) in the Office of the Secretary of Defense as the special assistant to the Assistant Secretary for Strategy and Requirements.

National Security Council

During President George W. Bush's first term, she was the director for Defense Strategy and Requirements on the National Security Council. She was responsible for interagency coordination for long-term defense planning and coalition maintenance issues. Projects she contributed to include conceptualizing and budgeting for continued transformation of defense practices, the most significant realignment of U.S. military forces and bases around the world since 1950, creating NATO's Allied Command Transformation and the NATO Response Force, and recruiting and retaining coalition partners for operations in Afghanistan and Iraq.

State Department

Schake was the deputy director for Policy Planning in the U.S. State Department from December 2007 to May 2008. Her responsibilities included staff management as well as resourcing and organizational effectiveness issues, including a study of State Department reforms that enable integrated political, economic, and military strategies.

Academia

She has held the Distinguished Chair of International Security Studies at West Point, and also served in the faculties of the Johns Hopkins School of Advanced International Studies, the University of Maryland's School of Public Policy, and the National Defense University.

She was previously a research fellow at Stanford University's Hoover Institution. She blogs regularly for Shadow Government on Foreign Policy and is on the editorial board of Orbis and the board of Centre for European Reform. She is also commonly featured on the Deep State Radio podcast. Schake advises Spirit of America, a 501(c)(3) organization that supports US troops.

Trans Atlantic Task Force

Since 2019, Schake has also been serving on the Transatlantic Task Force of the German Marshall Fund and the Bundeskanzler-Helmut-Schmidt-Stiftung (BKHS), co-chaired by Karen Donfried and Wolfgang Ischinger.

McCain-Palin campaign

Schake left the State Department in order to serve as a senior policy adviser to the McCain-Palin 2008 presidential campaign, where she was responsible for policy development and outreach in the areas of foreign and defense policy. Earlier in the campaign, she had been an adviser to Rudy Giuliani.

In 2020, Kori endorsed Joe Biden for president following Rudy Giuliani joining President Donald Trump's legal team in 2018. On February 12, 2021, Secretary of Defense Lloyd Austin appointed Schake as one of four Departmental representatives to the Commission on the Naming of Items of the Department of Defense that Commemorate the Confederate States of America or Any Person Who Served Voluntarily with the Confederate States of America.

Personal life 
Schake was raised in a small town in Sonoma County, California, by her parents Cecelia and Wayne, a former Pan Am pilot. Kori has a brother and sister. Kristina Schake, her 8-year-younger sister, has also worked in the White House, and played key roles in Democratic presidential campaigns, working with Michelle Obama and Hillary Clinton's 2016 campaign. Kori is a Republican. Despite their political differences, they remain very close.

Publications

 America vs the West: Can the Liberal World Order be preserved?, (Penguin Random House Australia, 2018) .
 
 State of Disrepair: Fixing the Culture and Practices of the State Department, (Hoover Institution 2012) .
 "Choices for the Quadrennial Defense Review", Orbis, Summer 2009.
 Managing American Hegemony: Essays on Power in a Time of Dominance, (Hoover Institution 2009) .
 The US Elections and Europe: The Coming Crisis of High Expectations, (Centre for European Reform, 2007).
 "Dealing with a Nuclear Iran," Policy Review (April/May 2007).
 "Jurassic Pork," The New York Times, 9 February 2006.
 "An American Eulogy for European Defence," in Anne Deighton, ed., Securing Europe? (ETH Zurich, 2006) .
 "National Security: A Better Approach," with Bruce Berkowitz, Hoover Digest (No. 4, 2005).
 The Berlin Wall Crisis, edited with John Gearson (Palgrave, 2002) .
 "How America Should Lead," (with Klaus Becher), Policy Review (August/September 2002).
 Constructive Duplication: Reducing EU Reliance on US Military Assets (Centre for European Reform, January 2002).
 The Strategic Implications of a Nuclear-Armed Iran, with Judith S. Yaphe, McNair Paper 64 (National Defense University Press, 2001).
 "Arms Control After the Cold War: The Challenge of Diverging Security Agendas," in S. Victor Papacosma, Sean Kay, and Mark R. Rubin, eds., NATO After Fifty Years (2001) .
 Do European Union Defense Initiatives Threaten NATO? (Strategic Forum, National Defense University, August 2001).
 Evaluating NATO’s Efficiency in Crisis Management, Les Notes de L’IFRI, No 21 (Institute Francais des Relations Internationales, 2000).
 "NATO’s ‘Fundamental Divergence’ Over Proliferation," in Ted Galen Carpenter, ed., The Journal of Strategic Studies, special issue on NATO Enters the 21st Century (September 2000); also published as a book by Frank Cass, 2001.
 "Building A European Defense Capability," with Amaya Bloch-Laine and Charles Grant, in Survival (IISS, Spring 1999).
 "NATO Chronicle: New World Disorder," Joint Forces Quarterly (April 1999).
 Zwischen Weissen Haus und Pariser Platz – Washington und Berlin in Strategischer Allianz, in Ralph Thiele and Hans-Ulrich Seitz, eds., Heraus-Forderung Zukunft (Report Verlag, 1999).
 "The Dayton Peace Accords:  Success or Failure?", in Kurt R. Spillmann and Joachim Krause, eds., International Security Challenges in a Changing World (Peter Lang, 1999) .
 "NATO After the Cold War, 1991–1996: Institutional Competition and the Collapse of the French Alternative," Contemporary European History, Vol 7, Part 3 (November 1998).
 "Beyond Russia and China: A Survey of Threats to U.S. Security from Lesser States," in Challenging the United States Symmetrically and Asymmetrically: Can America Be Defeated?, Lloyd J. Matthews, ed., (U.S. Army War College, July 1998).
 Europe After NATO Expansion: The Unfinished Security Agenda (Policy Paper #38, Institute on Global Conflict and Cooperation, February 1998).
 "The Breakup of Yugoslavia," in Roderick K. von Lipsey, ed., Breaking the Cycle: A Framework for Conflict Resolution (St. Martin's Press, 1997) .
 "The Berlin Crises of 1948–49 and 1958–62," in Beatrice Heuser and Robert O’Neill, eds., Securing Peace in Europe, 1945–1962 (MacMillan, 1992) .

References

External links
 

American foreign policy writers
George W. Bush administration personnel
Stanford University alumni
University of Maryland, College Park alumni
United States Military Academy faculty
University of Maryland, College Park faculty
Johns Hopkins University faculty
Living people
Foreign Policy Research Institute
1962 births
Neoconservatism